Foggy Lake is a glacial lake located in Snohomish County, Washington and in the Mount Baker-Snoqualmie National Forest. The lake lies in Gothic Basin, below the east face of Gothic Peak and the south face of Del Campo Peak. The lake is a popular area for hiking, camping, and swimming.

See also
Gothic Basin

References

External links
Weden Creek (Gothic Basin) Trail 724

Lakes of Washington (state)
Lakes of Snohomish County, Washington